Hetta is a village in the municipality of Enontekiö in the north-west part of Finnish Lapland. 

Hetta may also refer to:

 Hetta Inlet, a bay in Alaska, U.S.
 Henrik Hetta (born 1989), Swedish ice hockey player
 Aslak Hætta, (1824–1854), one of the leaders of the Kautokeino Rebellion in 1852
 Aslak Hetta, opera by Armas Launis (1884–1959)
 Hetta Frith, character in Places Where They Sing by Simon Raven (1970)
 Hetta Carbury, character in The Way We Live Now by Anthony Trollope (1875)
 Sis Hetta, character in Jubilee by Margaret Walker (1966)
 E. hetta, sea slug species of Elysia (gastropod)

See also
Harriet (name)
Henrietta (given name)
Heta (disambiguation)